Dellichthys is a small genus of clingfishes from the family Gobiesocidae which are endemic to New Zealand. It had been regarded as a monotypic genus but a second species was described in 2018.

Species
Dellichthys morelandi Briggs, 1955 (New Zealand urchin clingfish)
Dellichthys trnskii Conway, Stewart & Summers, 2018

Etymology
The name of this genus was copined by John C. Briggs in 1955 and it honours the malacologist Richard Kenneth Dell (1920-2002), of the Te Papa Museum in Wellington, New Zealand, he had an interest in the shore fishes of New Zealand and providedmaterial for Briggs to study.

References

 
Gobiesocidae
Endemic marine fish of New Zealand